Petershain is a railway station in the village of Quitzdorf am See, Saxony, Germany. The station lies on the Węgliniec–Roßlau railway, train services are operated by Ostdeutsche Eisenbahn.

Train services
The station is served by the following services:

regional service  Hoyerswerda - Görlitz

References

External links
 
 Deutsche Bahn website
 Ostdeutsche Eisenbahn website

Railway stations in Saxony